Luís Diogo Sousa Frade (born 11 September 1998) is a Portuguese handball player for FC Barcelona  and the Portuguese national team.

He represented Portugal at the 2020 European Men's Handball Championship.

Honours
 Spanish Handball League:
 Winner: 2020–21, 2021–22
 Copa ASOBAL:
 Winner: 2023
 Supercopa Ibérica:
 Winner: 2022

Individual awards
Handball-Planet - Best young player in the world: 2020

References

External links

Living people
1998 births
Portuguese male handball players
Sporting CP handball players
Handball players at the 2020 Summer Olympics
People from Gondomar, Portugal
Sportspeople from Porto District